The 2014–15 CERH European League was the 50th season of Europe's premier club roller hockey tournament organised by CERH, and the 19th season since it was renamed from the European Champion Clubs' Cup to the CERH Champions League/European League.

The final four tournament was played at PalaSind in Bassano del Grappa, Italy. Holders Barcelona defeated fellow Spanish side Vic 4–3 in the final to retain the title and extend their competition record to 21 wins.

Teams
League positions of the previous season shown in parentheses (TH: Title holders, CW: Cup winners, LSF: Losing semi-finalists).

Round dates
The schedule of the competition is as follows (draw held at CERH headquarters in Lisbon, Portugal, on 6 September 2014).

Group stage
The draw for the group stage was held in Lisbon on 6 September 2014. The 16 teams were allocated into four pots, with the title holders being placed in Pot 1 automatically. The team were then drawn into four groups of four, with the restriction that teams from the same association could not be drawn against each other. In each group, teams play against each other home-and-away in a round-robin format. The matchdays are 18 October, 1 November, 22 November, 13 December 2014, 17 January, and 7 February 2015. The group winners and runners-up advance to the quarter-finals.

A total of six national associations are represented in the group stage. Juventude de Viana, Forte dei Marmi, Hockey Breganze and La Vendéenne all made their debut appearances in this phase.

Group A

Group B

Group C

Group D

Knockout phase
The knockout phase comprises a quarter-final round and the final four tournament. In the quarter-finals, group stage winners will play against group stage runners-up, the latter hosting the first of two legs. The winners qualify for the final four, which tookplace at the ground of one of the four finalists.

Quarter-finals
The first-leg matches were played on 7 March, and the second-leg matches were played on 21 March 2015.

|}

Final four
The final four tournament took place on 2 and 3 May 2015, and was hosted by Hockey Breganze at PalaSind, in Bassano del Grappa. All times in CEST.

Semi-finals

Final

See also
2014 CERH Continental Cup
2014 FIRS Intercontinental Cup
2014–15 CERS Cup
2014–15 CERH Women's European League

References

External links

Rink Hockey Euroleague
2014 in roller hockey
CERH European League